The Libertarian Party (French: Parti Libertarien) is a political party in Belgium, which operates in the Walloon Region and the Brussels Region, in the French Community and in the German-speaking Community of Belgium.

History 
The party was launched in 2012.

On 6 March 2015, the party was one of the 12 founding members of the International Alliance of Libertarian Parties (IALP).

References 

Political parties in Belgium
Political parties established in 2012
2012 establishments in Belgium
Libertarian parties
Libertarianism in Belgium